Events in the year 1995 in Greece.

Incumbents

Events
 8 March  
 The 1995 presidential election is held. The Hellenic Parliament elects Konstantinos Stephanopoulos as the new President of the Hellenic Republic.
13 May – The 6.6  Kozani-Grevena earthquake shook the area with a maximum Mercalli intensity of VIII (Severe), injuring 25 and causing $450 million in damage.
15 June – The 6.5  Aigio earthquake shook the area with a maximum Mercalli intensity of VII (Very strong), killing 26, injuring 290 and causing $660 million in damage.

Births
 25 July – Maria Sakkari, tennis player
 15 November – Eleni Doika, rhythmic gymnast
 15 December – Alexia Kyriazi, rhythmic gymnast

Deaths

 14 October – Helen Vlachos, journalist (born 1911)

References

 
Years of the 20th century in Greece
Greece
1990s in Greece
Greece